Ramona Petraviča (born 25 September 1967 in Auce) is a Latvian politician, who between 23 January 2019 and 3 June 2021 served as Minister for Welfare in the Kariņš cabinet led by Prime Minister Krišjānis Kariņš.

References 

1967 births
Living people
People from Auce
Who Owns the State? politicians
Latvia First politicians
Ministers of Welfare of Latvia
Deputies of the 14th Saeima
21st-century Latvian women politicians
Women deputies of the Saeima